Harutaeographa craspedophora is a moth of the family Noctuidae. It is found in the Paghman Mountains of  Afghanistan.

References

Moths described in 1969
Orthosiini